Amelia Adamo (born 24 February 1947) is a Swedish journalist. She established several women's magazines and worked as an editor-in-chief.

Biography
She was born in Rome, Italy, and went to Sweden soon after her birth. She received a degree in social sciences. She has worked on magazines such as Svensk Damtidning, Husmodern and VeckoRevyn. She was the editor-in-chief of the latter. Adamo started the magazines Amelia (1995), Tara (2000) and M-magasin (2006).

Adamo has married third times. She first married Lars Ericsson who was the summer editor-in-chief at Svensk Dagtidning. They had two sons, and Ericsson died of cancer. Her second husband was Thorbjörn Larsson, former chief editor of Aftonbladet. Her third husband is an Italian.

References

External links

1947 births
Living people
Swedish magazine founders
Swedish newspaper editors
Italian emigrants to Sweden
20th-century Italian women writers
21st-century Swedish women writers
Journalists from Rome